Jan Werner (25 July 1946 – 21 September 2014) was a Polish sprinter who specialized in the 200 and 400 metres.

He was born in Brzeziny and represented the club AZS Warszawa. At the 1966 European Championships he finished fourth in the 200 metres and won the 4 x 400 metres relay together with Edmund Borowski, Stanislaw Gredzinski and Andrzej Badeński. At the 1967 European Indoor Games he competed in the relay final, but the team did not finish, and at the 1968 European Indoor Games he won a gold medal in the relay.

His first Olympic Games were in 1968. He finished fifth in his semi-final heat in the 400 metres, barely missing out on the final. In the 4 x 400 metres relay he finished fourth together with Stanislaw Gredzinski, Jan Balachowski and Andrzej Badeński. With the same team members he finished fourth in the relay at the 1969 European Championships. In the individual distance he won the gold medal. At the 1969 European Indoor Games he won the 400 metres silver medal behind Balachowski, as well as a relay gold medal.

At the 1970 European Indoor Championships the Polish relay team won silver medals. At the 1971 European Indoor Championships he won a gold medal in the 4 x 400 metres relay together with Waldemar Korycki, Andrzej Badeński and Jan Balachowski. With the same team members he won a silver medal in the relay at the 1971 European Championships. He won a bronze medal in the individual distance. The same team won the relay at the 1972 European Indoor Championships.

At the 1972 Olympic Games he reached the semi-final in the 400 metres and finished fifth in the relay. At the 1976 Olympic Games he finished eighth in the 400 metres and won a silver medal in the relay, together with Ryszard Podlas, Zbigniew Jaremski and Jerzy Pietrzyk.

He became Polish 200 metres champion in 1967, 1969 and 1971 and 400 metres champion in 1968, 1970, 1971 and 1976. His personal best time in the 400 metres was 45.44 seconds, achieved in 1976. He did also equal the European record in the 200 metres with 20.4 seconds on 3 June 1967.

Died 21 September 2014 in Warsaw.

References

1946 births
2014 deaths
Polish male sprinters
Olympic silver medalists for Poland
Athletes (track and field) at the 1968 Summer Olympics
Athletes (track and field) at the 1972 Summer Olympics
Athletes (track and field) at the 1976 Summer Olympics
Olympic athletes of Poland
Polish athletics coaches
People from Wieluń County
European Athletics Championships medalists
Sportspeople from Łódź Voivodeship
Medalists at the 1976 Summer Olympics
Olympic silver medalists in athletics (track and field)
Universiade medalists in athletics (track and field)
Universiade gold medalists for Poland
Medalists at the 1970 Summer Universiade